Marist College Kogarah is an independent Roman Catholic single sex secondary day school for boys, located in Bexley, a suburb located in the St George region of Sydney, New South Wales, Australia.

The college was founded in 1909, and has a tradition based on the teachings of the French educator Saint Marcellin Champagnat, the founder of the Marist Brothers. The school offers education to approximately 1,200 students from Year 7 to Year 12.

History
Marist College Kogarah was established in 1908 as the Kogarah Boys' School, a primary school for boys. The Marist Brothers agreed to establish the school after requests by John O'Driscoll, parish priest of the new parish of Kogarah. As demand for secondary education grew in the region, junior secondary classes were added to the school in the late 1920s. By 1938 it was a full secondary school, presenting pupils for the Leaving Certificate. By the 1940s it was the largest Catholic School in Australia. In the 1960s, the school became part of the new Archdiocesan system of schools and this had important consequences for Kogarah. Parish schools were preferred for primary education and so in 1982 primary classes ended at Marist Brothers Kogarah. From 1984, senior girls were enrolled in Years 11 and 12. This was however short-lived due to the establishment of Bethany College in 1993.

Former Principal, Br John Patrick O'Brien was sentenced to 7 years gaol by Lismore District Court for 11 counts of indecent assault against 4 different students whilst at St Joseph's Hunters Hill. Sentencing was on 6th November 2021.

School crest and motto 
Over the years the school has had three crest designs. They all have in common a red cross dividing a shield into four fields. Above the shield is the school motto Finis Coronat Opus, meaning "The End Crowns the Work"; below is the s
chool name. The redesigns were required after the school's name was altered. The crest's symbols were also rearranged after the first redesign.
The fields contain the following symbols: 
The Marist symbol
The Southern Cross, the symbol of Australia
The Waratah, the symbol of New South Wales
An open book to symbolise learning

House system 
The present school house system has been operating since 2000. As each new student begins at the school, he is allocated to a house and its colour. The school has four houses that have been named after people that have made a lasting impact on the school.  Students are involved in House Competitions which include Sporting, Cultural and Academic events. The four houses are:
 Cooper: Named after Alfred Cooper, a benefactor of the school.
 Gonzaga: Named after the first principal of the school, Brother Gonzaga Brown.
 Gilroy : Named after Cardinal Gilroy of Sydney, who was enrolled in the school on the first day of lessons in 1909.
 Lindwall : Named after Ray Lindwall, a first-grade St George rugby league footballer and cricketer who represented for Australia at Test level.

Tuition 
Subjects offered for the NSW Higher School Certificate (HSC) include English Standard, English Advanced, English Extension 1, English Extension 2, General Mathematics,Mathematics, Mathematics Extension 1, Mathematics Extension 2, Chemistry, Physics, Biology, Engineering Studies, Studies of Religion 1, Studies of Religion 2, Geography, Modern History, Ancient History, History Extension, Economics, Business Studies, Italian Beginners, Italian Continuers, Music 1, Music 2, Visual Arts, PDHPE, Industrial Technology, Design and Technology, Information Processes and Technology, and Software Design and Development.

Principals 
The following individuals hav served as Principal of Marist College Kogarah:

Sport

Notable alumni 

Academic
 Glyn Davis  – Vice-Chancellor of the University of Melbourne

Clergy
 Cardinal Sir Norman Thomas Gilroy – first Australian Cardinal; Australian of the Year 1971
 Bishop Edward Kelly – former Bishop of Toowoomba
 Monsignor John Slowey – Director of the Sydney Catholic Education Office; co-founder of the Australian Catholic University

Entertainment, media and the arts
Geoff Plummer - (1954-2006) Founding member and original drummer for 50s revival band Ol' 55 (band)
 Warren Fahey  – Australian Folklorist, founder of Folkways Music and Larrikin Records, former Deputy managing director Festival Mushroom Group.
 John Hargreaves – actor; only actor to receive the Byron Kennedy Award
 Chris Holland – former College vice-captain, member of Australian band Operator Please
 Paul Merciadez – member of Justice Dance Crew who won Australia's Got Talent in 2010
 Dom Turner - blues guitarist and founder The Backsliders

Politics, economics, public service and the law
 John Ajaka – Australian politician and member of the New South Wales Legislative Council
 Kevin Greene – former Australian politician and member of the New South Wales Legislative Assembly
 Nicholas Kamper - Founder and CEO of Purpose Bureau
 Chris Minns - Leader of the Opposition and Leader of Labor Party in NSW 

Sport
 Peter Armstrong – rugby league footballer; St. George Dragons hooker (1957–1964)
 Jim Bailey – athlete; Olympian (Melbourne 1956)
 Michael Beattie – rugby league footballer for the St. George Dragons; captain
 George Carstairs – rugby league footballer for the St. George Dragons (1921–29) and Australian representative (1921–22)
 Frank Farrell – former rugby league footballer who played for Newtown Jets, NSW and Australia
 Keith Galloway – rugby league footballer for the Wests Tigers and the Cronulla Sharks. Played for Australia.
 Blagoj Janev – professional basketball player for the Sydney Kings
 Michael Korkidas – former rugby league footballer for the Sydney Roosters in the NRL, and various clubs in the Super League.
 Ray Lindwall – cricket player; considered one of the greatest fast bowlers of all time
 Daryl Millard – former rugby league footballer for the St. George Illawarra Dragons and Canterbury Bulldogs
 George Ndaira – former rugby league footballer for the Newcastle Knights, St. George Illawarra Dragons and South Sydney Rabbitohs
 Kerry O'Keeffe – Australian cricketer and commentator.
 Josh Reynolds – professional rugby league footballer for the Wests Tigers (formerly Canterbury Bulldogs)
 Warren Saunders – former NSW and St George cricket captain
 Jason Stevens – rugby league footballer for the Cronulla Sharks, Australian Kangaroo's and NSW Blues
 Robert Stone – rugby league footballer for the St. George Dragons and NSW Blues
 Robert Windle – Olympic gold medallist in the 1500 m freestyle (Tokyo 1964) – Swimming
 Matt Dufty - current Rugby League player for the St George Illawarra Dragons.

See also 

 List of Catholic schools in New South Wales
 Catholic education in Australia

References

External links 
Marist College Kogarah Website
MCC Association
Marist Schools Australia

Catholic secondary schools in Sydney
Educational institutions established in 1909
Association of Marist Schools of Australia
Boys' schools in New South Wales
Metropolitan Catholic Colleges Sports Association
1909 establishments in Australia